Klackenbergia is a genus of flowering plants belonging to the gentian family (Gentianaceae) and the tribe Exaceae. It only contains two species, both endemic to Madagascar.  They are notable for their inflorescence with characteristic long bracts and bracteoles and
sub-sessile flowers arranged in axillary fascicules at each
node.

The genus is named after Jens Klackenberg (1951-).

Species
 Klackenbergia stricta (Schinz) Kissling
 Klackenbergia condensata (Klack.) Kissling

References

Gentianaceae genera
Gentianaceae